Allosediminivita is a Gram-negative and short-rod-shaped bacterial genus from the family Rhodobacteraceae. Roseivivax pacificus has been reclassified to Allosediminivita pacifica.

References

Rhodobacteraceae
Bacteria genera
Taxa described in 2020
Monotypic bacteria genera